Wilkin Chal Ruan (born September 18, 1978) is a former Major League Baseball outfielder.

Career
Known primarily for his speed, Ruan was signed as an undrafted free agent by the Montreal Expos on November 15, . Against more experienced U.S. pitchers he struggled slightly, hitting only .239 for the Gulf Coast Expos that season, though he still stole 13 bases.

In , he started at the Expos High-A team in Jupiter and hit .283 with 25 steals before being promoted to their Harrisburg Double-A team.

On March 23,  he was traded by the Expos to the Los Angeles Dodgers along with pitcher Guillermo Mota for Jorge Nunez and Matt Herges. He started the 2002 season with the Dodgers Double-A team in Jacksonville where he hit .253 with 23 steals and finished the season with the Triple-A Las Vegas 51s where he hit .327 with 12 steals in 40 games. That earned him a September call-up to the Dodgers major league roster. He made his major league debut on September 1 as a pinch runner. He got his first major league hit the following day against the Arizona Diamondbacks. He was primarily used as a pinch runner during his month-long stay in the big leagues.

In , he was the starting center fielder for the Las Vegas 51s all season, hitting .308 with a whopping 41 steals in 49 attempts. He had a couple of stints with the Dodgers in 2003 also, hitting .220 in limited opportunities.

However, he had a tough spring training in  where he hit only .128 and wound up back in Jacksonville for the start of the season, hitting only .208 with 9 steals for the Suns, causing the Dodgers to release him on June 19, 2004.

On July 2, he was signed as a minor league free agent by the Kansas City Royals and sent to their Double-A team in Wichita where he rebounded slightly, hitting .276 with 11 steals. He remained at Wichita for the  season, hitting .254 with 18 steals in somewhat limited playing time.

Released by the Royals after the 2005 season, he rejoined the Dodgers, signing to play once more with Jacksonville. He hit .260 with 18 steals as the starting center fielder for the Suns. He became a free agent at the end of the season and signed a minor league contract with the Philadelphia Phillies on December 17, 2008.

External links

1978 births
Living people
Cape Fear Crocs players
Dominican Republic expatriate baseball players in the United States
Estrellas Orientales players
Gulf Coast Expos players
Harrisburg Senators players
Jacksonville Suns players
Jupiter Hammerheads players
Las Vegas 51s players

Leones del Caracas players
American expatriate baseball players in Venezuela
Los Angeles Dodgers players
Major League Baseball outfielders
Major League Baseball players from the Dominican Republic
Wichita Wranglers players
Dominican Republic expatriate baseball players in Venezuela